Juba, sometimes spelled Joba, is the pseudonym of an anonymous sniper involved in the Iraqi insurgency, featured in several videos. Juba became famous after videos including footage of his shootings appeared online. The second of these videos shows Juba marking a tally of 37 "kills".  Juba became a folk hero among many Iraqis due to his role in fighting against the American military in Iraq. Speculations have been made that Juba is not one person but multiple snipers working under a pseudonym.

Juba worked in mostly Sunni parts of Iraq, specifically the Anbar province. Juba's videos showed real battle scenes with background nasheeds. In many videos, Juba is seen killing multiple American soldiers with what seems to be a Dragunov sniper rifle. Juba is seen killing at ranges of few hundred meters (yards) to approximately a thousand meters (yards) in the videos.

Videos 
Several video clips which allegedly show the actions of Juba have been circulated over the Internet. Videos included parts of the actual clips taken during anti-US sniper operations with digital cameras mounted over the sniper rifle.

First video 
In November 2005, a video which was circulating in Iraq appeared on the Internet. The video, attributed to the Sunni insurgent group Islamic Army in Iraq, showed American soldiers being shot and falling to the ground. The video starts with a man saying, "I have nine bullets in this gun, and I have a present for George Bush. I am going to kill nine soldiers. I am doing this for the viewers to watch. God is greater. God is greater." With that, he makes his way from the vehicle, and a series of separate scenes follow showing several individuals shot in action.

Second video 

A second "Juba" video was distributed in 2006 in western Baghdad and released on the Internet in late October 2006. The video contained an interview with the supposed commander of the Baghdad sniper division, the footage shows numerous fighters being trained in the use of sniper rifles. The video discusses the alleged fear generated in coalition forces by insurgency snipers and shows "Juba" returning from a sniping mission, marking a tally of  37 on a wall. The sniper then sits down to make a diary entry. The video claims that there are dozens of snipers operating within the IAI and other factions, and shows more being trained. The rest of the video shows numerous clips of U.S. soldiers being sniped with nasheeds in the background, and an insurgent commander explaining that his men are inspired and trained to an extent based on the information in the book The Ultimate Sniper by retired Major and U.S. Army sniper John Plaster.

Third and fourth videos 
In December 2007, "Juba - The Baghdad Sniper 3" was released on the Internet. The production quality of the video was improved from Islamic Army's previous releases; the video was made available in nine languages. This video also refers to a website that is supposedly connected to the Juba character. In 2008, "Juba - The Baghdad Sniper 4" was released on the Internet and on that website.

In popular culture

Juba is the basis for the expert insurgent sniper character codenamed "Mustafa" in the war film American Sniper.

Juba is referenced multiple times in the 2017 war film The Wall.

See also 
 Simo Häyhä
 Abu Tahsin al-Salhi
 Abu Azrael
 Chris Kyle
 Tha'ir Kayid Hamad
 Nguyễn Văn Cốc
 Erwin König

References

External links 
News reports
 Carroll, Rory (2005). Elusive sniper saps U.S. morale in Baghdad, The Guardian, August 5, 2005
 Juba the Sniper Legend haunting troops in Iraq, Stars and Stripes, April 22, 2007

Tactics of the Iraqi insurgency (2003–2011)
Military snipers
Iraqi propagandists
Salafi jihadists
Unidentified people
Possibly living people